Star Fox 2 is a rail shooter video game developed by Nintendo and Argonaut Software and published by Nintendo. Originally developed for the Super Nintendo Entertainment System, it was completed in 1995 but did not see an official release until 2017 on the Super NES Classic Edition.

Like the original Star Fox (1993), Star Fox 2 pushed the graphical capabilities of the SNES with Argonaut's Super FX chip. Dylan Cuthbert was lead programmer, with Shigeru Miyamoto returning as producer and Katsuya Eguchi as director. Star Fox 2 introduces semi-real-time gameplay, new ship types, new playable characters, and a more advanced 3D game engine. The story continues the battle against Emperor Andross, who seeks to destroy the Lylat system. 

By 1995, 3D technology was advancing quickly and the 3D game market was expanding, with competition from the Sony PlayStation and Sega Saturn consoles. Concerned that the 16-bit graphics of Star Fox 2 would compare poorly against newer games, Nintendo instead prioritized its upcoming Nintendo 64 console. The Nintendo 64 game Star Fox 64 (1997) incorporated some concepts introduced in Star Fox 2.

In the years after the cancellation, various prototype ROM images were leaked online. In 2017, Star Fox 2 was officially released for the first time as one of 21 games included in the Super NES Classic Edition. In 2019, it became available for the Nintendo Switch to subscribers of the Nintendo Switch Online service.

Gameplay

Instead of following mostly linear paths inside predefined missions as in Star Fox, the player moves a team of two ships freely around a map screen that represents the Lylat system. When the player's ships make contact with enemy forces, the game switches to an action perspective, piloting the Arwing ship directly with controls and gameplay similar to the first Star Fox. When the player clears the specified objectives, they are taken back to the map screen to select a new destination.

The objective is to beat all enemy forces present in the map while defending planet Corneria, preventing its damage level from reaching 100%. The player must intercept fighters and incoming IPBMs (interplanetary ballistic missiles), while also dealing with battleships, which deploy more fighter squadrons, and planetary bases, which fire IPBMs. If Corneria's damage level reaches 100% or the player runs out of extra ships, the game ends. General Pepper employs a satellite that can shoot down enemies on a limited basis; the player must also defend this installation from special enemies that can take over the satellite and use its cannon to fire at Corneria. The player also encounters the Star Wolf mercenary team and various bosses.

Star Fox 2 employs a semi-real-time strategy system. While selecting a destination on the map screen, the game is paused, but while the player's ships travel to their destinations, enemies and missiles also move toward theirs. While fighting enemies in the action screen, time moves at a slower pace than on the map screen, allowing other enemies and missiles to advance and cause damage. To prevent excessive damage to Corneria, the player may need to leave a battle to intercept another enemy.

Plot
After his defeat in the original Star Fox, the antagonist, Andross, returns to the Lylat system and launches an all-out attack against Corneria, using his new fleet of battleships and giant missiles launched from hidden bases to destroy the planet. General Pepper again calls upon the Star Fox team for help. Armed with new custom Arwings, a Mothership, and two new recruits (Miyu and Fay), the Star Fox team sets out to defend Corneria by destroying Andross's forces before they can inflict critical damage on the planet. Along the way, Star Fox must also combat giant bosses, bases on planets throughout the Lylat system, members of the Star Wolf team and finally Andross himself.

Star Fox 2 features six playable characters, more than any game in the series until Star Fox Command (2006). These include Fox McCloud, fearless leader of the Star Fox team, Falco Lombardi, the ace pilot with a headstrong attitude and is Fox's best friend, Peppy Hare, longtime mentor to Fox, and Slippy Toad, the team's young tech analyst and Fox's childhood friend. The two new playable characters are Miyu, a tomboyish lynx, and Fay, a white dog and part of an aristocratic family. Star Fox 2 also introduces a team of rival mercenary pilots, Star Wolf, which includes Wolf O'Donnell, leader of Star Wolf and a despicable criminal, Leon Powalski, an inscrutable and sinister chameleon, Pigma Dengar, an arrogant and selfish pig who is a former member of the Star Fox team before betraying them, and Algy, a devious creature with incredible precision aim.

Development

Like its predecessor Star Fox (1993), Star Fox 2 was co-developed by Nintendo EAD in Japan and the British company Argonaut Software. Development began shortly after work was finished on the European and competition versions of Star Fox. Argonaut had a contract with Nintendo to create three games; after Star Fox, Argonaut programmers Giles Goddard and Dylan Cuthbert worked on Stunt Race FX (1994) and Cuthbert on Star Fox 2. Cuthbert worked out of Nintendo's headquarters in Kyoto and had little contact with Argonaut during development. He served as lead programmer and was assigned two Japanese Nintendo programmers to work under him. The team was overseen by designers Shigeru Miyamoto and Katsuya Eguchi, with Eguchi as director. Edge reported in December 1993 that development on a sequel to Star Fox had begun.

The team decided early on to use the Super FX 2 chip in the game cartridge. It was an enhanced version of the Super FX, a reduced instruction set computer (RISC) for SNES ROM cartridges developed by Argonaut. The original chip was designed to calculate 3D math quickly and was first used in Star Fox. The Super FX 2 had more memory and ran at 21 MHz, twice as fast as the original chip. Argonaut's original proposal for the Super FX used this improved architecture, but Nintendo found it too expensive.  Cuthbert also rewrote parts of the engine to run in parallel in RAM to free more Super FX 2 processing for more advanced features, such as planar clipping and advanced collision detection. These enhancements enabled the chip to manipulate more polygons and sprites and to map textures more quickly, giving the team the computing power needed for free-roaming 3D environments. Such free-roaming gameplay was planned for the original Star Fox, but it was made on-rails because of the original Super FX chip's limited computing powers. Cuthbert also retooled the engine to increase the frame rate from 20 to 30 frames per second, but it was not steady so they locked the frame rate at 20 FPS. Freely explorable environments were the only gameplay element planned for the original Star Fox carried into Star Fox 2; all other ideas were new.

Miyamoto considered the Star Fox series a platform for experimenting with new gameplay ideas. The team experimented more with Star Fox 2 than Star Fox. This creativity led to gameplay ideas such as the platforming sequences with the robot walker. Miyamoto took great interest in Cuthbert's platforming gameplay (before Super Mario 64's release in 1996). At one point in development, the Walker sequences occurred in much larger space stations with energy gates that needed to be unlocked, a gameplay structure comparable to dungeon crawling. Because of the Super FX 2's greater computing power, the team decided to have the fighters visibly transform into bipedal Walkers. The transformation was made in a realistic sense; the artists even drafted the mechanisms by which the fighters transformed.

Director Eguchi wanted to explore a more roguelike game system and use similar game mechanics to Star Luster (1985). He played Star Luster repeatedly for inspiration and was particularly fond of its random encounters system. He also enjoyed Fortune Street and was inspired by its more strategic gameplay elements. Given this direction, the team designed the main gameplay structure: players would move across a map defending planets from the enemy, battling in randomly generated enemy encounters. It was designed to play out differently each gameplay session. For further replayability, the team added six playable characters, two of which were series newcomers: Miyu and Fay. More antagonists were added, including Wolf. A two-player mode was planned and tested, but the team could not get the frame rate high and steady enough for it to be enjoyable.

Promotion at Winter CES 
Star Fox 2 was playable on the show floor at the Winter Consumer Electronics Show (Winter CES) in Las Vegas in January 1995. The version demonstrated was significantly different from the final version. GamePro enjoyed the free-roaming gameplay, the craft morphing ability, and strategy elements. Electronic Gaming Monthly also liked the shift to free-roaming and felt the non-linear gameplay and ship morphing abilities were major improvements. Nintendo Power dubbed it their top SNES game of the show. All three magazines thought Star Fox 2 was better than the original. Edge was more critical, writing that Star Fox 2 was Nintendo's attempt to keep the SNES relevant. They wrote that the Super FX polygons were not particularly impressive, and the gameplay lacked "the immediate appeal of its predecessor". A man was arrested and charged with felony grand larceny for attempting to steal a demo cart from the show floor.

Cancellation

By mid-1995, Star Fox 2 was nearing completion, and was planned for release in August. However, 3D technology was advancing quickly and the 3D game market was expanding, with competition from the Sony PlayStation and Sega Saturn. The consoles ran impressive 3D graphics that captured the public's attention. Nintendo was concerned that the 16-bit Star Fox 2 3D visuals would be compared to the superior 3D capabilities of competing consoles.  Cuthbert said that Star Fox 2 would be "compared directly against games such as Ridge Racer, which felt like you finally had an arcade machine's power in your home".

Nintendo decided to prioritize its upcoming Nintendo 64 console, including a new Star Fox game, Star Fox 64. According to Cuthbert, Miyamoto wanted a clear break between 3D games on the SNES and Nintendo 64. The Super FX 2 chip also raised the cost of production, which would have made Star Fox 2 an expensive release.

Star Fox 2 was canceled in mid-1995, when it was about 95% complete. Nintendo still wanted the game finished after cancellation, so took it through full localization and QA testing. Cuthbert said there may have been no official announcement of cancellation, and there was confusion about the game's status in the media. The August issue of GamePro printed that it had been delayed to 1996, while Electronic Gaming Monthly wrote that had been canceled in their September issue. Nintendo Power wrote in their September issue that "rumors of the demise of Star Fox 2 have been greatly exaggerated", with a release most likely coming in the first half of 1996.

Release
For many years, the completed version of Star Fox 2 remained in Nintendo's archives. Super FX games were not considered for Nintendo's Virtual Console content distribution service because Nintendo had difficulty emulating the chip. In 2015, Miyamoto told journalists: "In my memory, I enjoyed [Star Fox 2] but I'm not sure I would release it, [...] I'd rather have people play a new game".

Beta leaks

In the years following cancellation, ROM images of incomplete builds of Star Fox 2 were leaked anonymously onto the internet. Cuthbert denied he had leaked it and suspected the ROMs had been taken from his hard drive after he left Argonaut.

The first ROMs leaked in the late 1990s were early test builds with numerous software bugs. These versions mostly consist of debug menus and sparsely populated landscapes; one version includes a 2-player mode. A few years later, an anonymous person reached out to the emulation community, saying that they had a non-working copy of the final beta ROM. The community determined that an internal header was missing and were able to add the header to get it functioning. The ROM image was leaked online after. This version was in Japanese and much more complete than previous versions. The emulation community was inspired by the release to improve Super FX chip handling in their Super NES emulators. A fan translation patch was also released which took four people and over 100 hours of work. The patch developers also changed a debug modifier that was set to zero, preventing Corneria from taking damage.

All leaked ROMs are beta versions. Some gameplay features do not work correctly, are incomplete, or hampered by bugs. According to Cuthbert, all the leaked ROMs lack the final few months of QA work. They were also all set up in debug mode, so the encounter systems and randomized gameplay elements do not work correctly. Speaking about the final beta ROM, he said: "The basic parts are there, but there is an adage in game development, 'The last 10 percent is 90 percent of the game' and the ROM is missing that last 10 percent of iteration and refinement".

Official release

When compiling a list of games to include on the Super NES Classic dedicated console, the system's producer proposed the inclusion of Star Fox 2. He thought it would be a waste otherwise to never release a completed and debugged game. Nintendo had preserved the game since its completion, making it easy to bring it to the Super NES Classic. The device was announced along with Star Fox 2's inclusion in June 2017. The announcement came as a delightful surprise to Cuthbert. No one from Argonaut or Q-Games was consulted or otherwise made aware ahead of the reveal. Some of the original developers celebrated the announcement.

The Super NES Classic was released on September 29, 2017, in North America and Europe and on October 5 in Japan. The version is the localized English ROM that was completed in the 1990s, though Cuthbert suspected Nintendo had to make minor changes, such as altering screen flashing, to get it past modern regulations. Promotional artwork for Star Fox 2 was created by Takaya Imamura, the original Star Fox character designer. The instruction manual was released digitally online and included concept art and design documents, an unusual move for Nintendo.

In December 2019, Nintendo released a video of upcoming games for its Nintendo Switch Online NES and Super NES services. The update includes Star Fox 2 as a part of its portfolio of games, playable by those with an active Nintendo Switch Online membership as of December 12, 2019.

Reception

Star Fox 2 received generally favorable reception from critics during its inclusion on the Super NES Classic Edition in 2017. Polygons Ross Miller found it to be ambitious and fun. Destructoids Chris Carter complimented the constant swap between viewpoints and playstyles, minimal "RPG-like" exposition between levels and the introduction of Star Wolf, stating that they added character into the game but noted its short length and criticized the low framerate. Eurogamers Christian Donlan described it as an unusual but "wonderfully surprising and inventive" sequel that builds upon the first Star Fox, due to its more roguelite nature. GamesRadar+ David Houghton gave positive remarks regarding the evolution of the franchise's core ideas and free-roaming 3D planets, but criticized its uncohesive game mechanics, overly ambitious ideas and "choppy" technical performance. 

IGNs Samuel Claiborn complimented its "janky-yet-plucky aesthetic" but complained that severe frame-rate drops plagued the game and that it was difficult to control the ships. Claiborn stated that it was the worst game in the SNES Classic Edition and wished the game had been cancelled. Nintendo Lifes Damien McFerran was positive to the game's depth, complexity and challenge, and called it a good reason to own a SNES Mini. Nintendo World Reports Neal Ronaghan and John Rairdin praised its distinctly structure and design, challenge, strategy and roguelike elements, audiovisual presentation, replayability and deep gameplay. Rairdin wrote that it was the most important game in the Star Fox series, and one of the greatest Super Nintendo games. However, both criticized the lack of rail shooter levels, slowdown and clipping issues, as well as limitations by its era of development. 

HobbyConsolas David Martínez commended the Arwing's transformation mechanic, open levels and introduction of new Star Fox members and Star Wolf but criticized the game's short length, technical shortcomings and controls, feeling that it was not well-rounded as the first entry. Digital Trends Mike Epstein felt that Star Fox 2 took some of the biggest risks the Star Fox franchise had attempted. The Verges Andrew Webster called it "a fascinating experience". GameSpots Michael Higham gave positive remarks to the land vehicle sequences, freedom of approach to manage an incoming threat and off-rails 3D dogfights in space, but criticized its poor technical performance, short length, and lacking sense of adventure when compared to the first Star Fox, among other aspects.

Legacy
After Star Fox 2 was canceled, Argonaut's contract with Nintendo ended. Cuthbert left Japan and moved to the United States to work with Sony. In 2001, he returned to Japan to establish Q-Games. The company collaborated with Nintendo in 2006 to develop Star Fox Command, and again in 2011 for Star Fox 64 3D. Cuthbert found the experimentation with Star Fox 2 personally helpful in his career.

Star Fox 2 inspired the design of later Star Fox games. Free-range flying and grounded vehicle gameplay were implemented into Star Fox 64, as was the Star Wolf team. Nintendo and Q-Games played Star Fox 2 to gather inspiration on its strategic gameplay elements for Star Fox Command. Miyamoto asked Cuthbert to make Command more similar to Star Fox 2 than the original Star Fox. The Arwing's ability to transform into the Walker was re-introduced in Star Fox Zero (2016). The game also drove ideas for future Nintendo 64 games. Cuthbert believes a lot of the platforming experimentation they ran in Star Fox 2 gave Miyamoto confidence for Super Mario 64.

Notes

References

External links

Official Star Fox 2 website - Nintendo.co.jp
 Design documents for StarFox 2 released by Nintendo - 1, 2

2017 video games
Argonaut Games games
Nintendo Switch Online games
Star Fox video games
Super FX games
Video games about extraterrestrial life
Super Nintendo Entertainment System games
Video games developed in Japan
Video games developed in the United Kingdom
Video games produced by Shigeru Miyamoto
Video game sequels
Vaporware video games
Single-player video games